Dudince (before 1927 Ďudince, rarely ) is a spa town in southern Slovakia. It is the smallest town in Slovakia with only a population of around 1,400. It is known for its mineral water, hot springs and destination spas. It's located near the edge of the Banská Bystrica Region of Slovakia.

Geography
It is located in the foothills of the Krupina Plain (inner western Carpathian Mountains) in the valley of the Štiavnica river, around 27 km south-west from Krupina and 15 km north from Šahy. Besides the main settlement, there is a formerly independent village, Merovce (annexed in 1960).

The town lies in the Stredoslovenska wine region and is surrounded by vineyards. Travertine piles and "Roman" spa (see image gallery) can also be found.

History
Archaeological discoveries show that the town was inhabited in the Neolithic era. The first written acknowledgement dates back to 1284 as Dyud. The oldest mention of hot springs was in 1551, but there is strong evidence that the Romas knew of the thermal pools over 2000 years ago. 

It was the venue for the 2013 European Race Walking Cup.

Demographics
According to the 2001 census, the town had 1,500 inhabitants. 95.67% of inhabitants were Slovaks, 3.53% Hungarians and 0.20% Roma. The religious make-up was 55.67% Roman Catholics, 28.93% Lutherans and 11.27% people with no religious affiliation.

Sister city
Dudince is a twin town of Kent, Ohio, in the United States.

See also
 List of municipalities and towns in Slovakia

References

Genealogical resources

The records for genealogical research are available at the state archive, Statny Archiv in Banska Bystrica, Nitra, Slovakia.

 Roman Catholic church records (births/marriages/deaths): 1784-1893 (parish B)
 Lutheran church records (births/marriages/deaths): 1783-1929 (parish B)

Photos

External links
 
 
 Spa Dudince
 Photo gallery from Dudince spa
 Dudince and its spa resorts
 Surnames of living people in Dudince

Cities and towns in Slovakia
Spa towns in Slovakia